Roy Gregory (born c. 1946) is a former American football coach. He served as the head football coach at Austin Peay State University from 1991 to 1996, compiling a record of 17–49.  Brewster was born in Tupelo, Mississippi and raised in Fulton, Mississippi, where he was an all-state fullback at Itawamba Agricultural High School.  He played college football at the University of Tennessee at Chattanooga from 1965 to 1967 as a middle guard.

Head coaching record

College

References

1940s births
Living people
Year of birth uncertain
Austin Peay Governors football coaches
Chattanooga Mocs football coaches
Chattanooga Mocs football players
Memphis Tigers football coaches
Mississippi State Bulldogs football coaches
New Mexico Lobos football coaches
South Carolina Gamecocks football coaches
Vanderbilt Commodores football coaches
High school football coaches in Tennessee
Players of American football from Mississippi
People from Fulton, Mississippi
People from Tupelo, Mississippi